Arcan is a Romanian surname. Notable people with the surname include:

Iurie Arcan (born 1964), Moldovan football player and manager
Nelly Arcan (1973–2009), Canadian novelist
Pietro Arcan (born 1977), Moldovan criminal and murderer

See also

Romanian-language surnames